UFC 179: Aldo vs. Mendes 2 was a mixed martial arts event held on October 25, 2014, at Ginásio do Maracanãzinho in Rio de Janeiro, Brazil.

Background
The event was headlined by a Featherweight Championship rematch between the current champion José Aldo, and top contender Chad Mendes.  Their first fight at UFC 142, also contested in Rio de Janeiro, ended in a first round knockout victory in favor of Aldo.

The headliner was originally scheduled to take place on August 2, 2014, at UFC 176. However, on July 2, Aldo pulled out of the fight citing a neck injury suffered during training. Subsequent to Aldo's injury, that event was postponed on July 8, when the UFC announced they were unable to replace the original main event fight and with less than a month before the event, the decision was made to postpone the event – though the promotion said the numbering scheme for already scheduled pay-per-views after it, including UFC 177 in Sacramento on August 30, would remain in consecutive order. That entire fight card was re-booked for other events.

Jeremy Stephens was linked to a possible bout with Lucas Martins at the event.  However, Stephens' manager indicated shortly after the fight announcement was leaked that they had no intention of taking the fight.  Martins faced Darren Elkins instead.

Fabrício Camões was originally scheduled to face Josh Shockley at the event. However, Shockley was removed from the bout citing injury and was replaced by Anthony Rocco Martin.

Alan Patrick was expected to face Beneil Dariush at this event. However, Patrick was forced to pull out due to a broken jaw he received during training.  Dariush instead faced Carlos Diego Ferreira.

During weigh ins, three fighters missed weight: Scott Jorgensen (128 lb), Fabrício Camões (158 lb) and Tony Martin (157 lb). Jorgensen was fined 20% of his purse, while Camões and Martin, who were involved in the same fight, were not issued a fine.

Results

Bonus awards
The following fighters were awarded $50,000 bonuses:

Fight of the Night: José Aldo vs. Chad Mendes
Performance of the Night: Fábio Maldonado and Gilbert Burns

See also
List of UFC events
2014 in UFC

References

Ultimate Fighting Championship events
2014 in mixed martial arts
Mixed martial arts in Brazil
International sports competitions in Rio de Janeiro (city)
2014 in Brazilian sport